Dusan Jevremovic, a.k.a. Jevrem (born 7 November 1988 in Kragujevac, Serbia) is a Serbian Nu Disco producer and DJ, currently based in Minnesota, United States.

He started his career as a DJ and a Producer at an early age of 14, although his creativity was showing ever since he was a toddler.
His first teen project called Ducer was oriented towards experimenting with multiple genres of electronic music such as Electro & Techno. During this time (Age 11-16) he was practicing music production as well as his musical skills, learning different instruments (keyboards, guitar, bass).
Further, under the alias of Gliese581, he started a unique project mixing Ambient and Techno. Realizing that Techno had a big role in the development of this sound, he was making exclusively Futuristic-Tech tunes.
Finally, he settled as Jevrem, maturing with his sound and production capability. This alias presents best of both worlds: the underground and commercial aspect of music production, which comes as the most suitable for constant publishing.
He was playing at major festivals in Serbia (Exit, Ru:Foam Fest) and clubs (Soda, Kragujevac, Serbia; UMK Club, Kragujevac, Serbia; Brankow, Belgrade, Serbia; Dom Omladine, Belgrade, Serbia; Feedback, Nish, Serbia; Kriterion, Sarajevo, Bosnia & Herzegovina; Red Carpet, St. Cloud, MN) alone or back to back with his fellow DJ & Producer Caligari.
You can find him at the Red Bull Stage in Red Carpet, St. Cloud regularly, where he mixes his all-time favorites with latest modern tunes.

Selected Discography

As an artist Jevrem  has released two EPs.

 White Mice (2016)
 500 Light Years (2013)

References 

  at Official website
  at Discogs

1988 births
Serbian DJs
Living people
Techno musicians
Electronic dance music DJs